Lukas Dunner (born 12 February 2002) is an Austrian racing driver who currently drives in the Mitropa Rally Cup and DKM for Škoda Motorsport.

Career

Karting
Dunner started karting in 2014 when he was 12. He won the Eastern European Rotax Max Challenge Central championship twice, once in the junior category and one in the mini max category.

Formula 4

F4 Spanish Championship 
In 2017 Dunner competed in Spanish F4 for MP Motorsport alongside Bent Viscaal, Christian Lundgaard, Nazim Azman and Marta García. Dunner finished the season with 129 points meaning he finished 8th in the standings, with a best result of third.

FIA Formula 3 Championship

Macau Grand Prix
Dunner competed in the Macau Grand Prix in 2019 for MP Motorsport. In qualifying Dunner finished 24th, nearly three seconds slower than pole sitter Jüri Vips. Dunner climbed twelve places to start the race in 12th during the qualification race; in the race he finished 14th.

2020 
For the 2020 season Dunner signed on with MP to partner Richard Verschoor and Bent Viscaal in his first season of the FIA Formula 3 Championship. He was unable to score points throughout the course of the season and finished 27th in the standings, having achieved a best result of twelfth place in the feature race at the Hungaroring.

Karting record

Karting career summary

Racing record

Career summary

* Season still in progress.

Complete F4 Spanish Championship results 
(key) (Races in bold indicate pole position) (Races in italics indicate fastest lap)

Complete Euroformula Open Championship results 
(key) (Races in bold indicate pole position; races in italics indicate points for the fastest lap of top ten finishers)

Complete FIA Formula 3 Championship results
(key) (Races in bold indicate pole position points; races in italics indicate fastest lap points)

References

External links
 

2002 births
Living people
Austrian racing drivers
Spanish F4 Championship drivers
ADAC Formula 4 drivers
Euroformula Open Championship drivers
FIA Formula 3 Championship drivers
Sportspeople from Vienna
SMP F4 Championship drivers
MP Motorsport drivers

Italian F4 Championship drivers
European Le Mans Series drivers
Prema Powerteam drivers
Drivex drivers
Teo Martín Motorsport drivers
Motopark Academy drivers
Austrian rally drivers